Stenodesmus may refer to:
 Stenodesmus (millipede), a genus of millipedes in the family Xystodesmidae
 Stenodesmus (plant), a genus of mosses in the family Daltoniaceae